Winamac Fish and Wildlife Area is a protected area dedicated to providing hunting and fishing opportunities while maintaining  of oak forest and upland fields. It is located on U.S. Route 35, north of Winamac, Indiana.

In the 1930s, The U.S. Department of the Interior purchased  of marginal farm land along the Tippecanoe River. The land was developed as a recreation demonstration area. In 1943, the property given to the State of Indiana as Tippecanoe River State Park. In 1959, the  moved to the Division of Fish and Game.

Facilities
Wildlife Viewing
Ice Fishing
Hunting
Trapping
Shooting Range
Archery Range
Dog Training Area

References

Parks in Indiana
Protected areas of Pulaksi County, Indiana
1943 establishments in Indiana
Protected areas established in 1943